The 15531 / 15532 Saharsa–Amritsar Jan Sadharan Express is an Express train belonging to Indian Railways East Central Railway zone that runs between  and  in India.

It operates as train number 15531 from Saharsa Junction to Amritsar Junction and as train number 15532 in the reverse direction, serving the states of Bihar, Uttar Pradesh,Uttarakhand, Haryana, Chandigarh & Punjab.

Coaches
The 15531 / 32 Saharsa Junction–Amritsar Junction Jan Sadharan Express has 16 general unreserved & two SLR (seating with luggage rake) coaches . It does not carry a pantry car.

As is customary with most train services in India, coach composition may be amended at the discretion of Indian Railways depending on demand.

Service

Routing

Traction

As the route is now fully electrified, a Tughlakabad-based WAP-7 electric locomotive pulls the train to its destination.

References

External links
15531 Jan Sadharan Express at India Rail Info
15532 Jan Sadharan Express at India Rail Info

Transport in Amritsar
Rail transport in Punjab, India
Rail transport in Chandigarh
Rail transport in Haryana
Rail transport in Uttar Pradesh
Rail transport in Bihar
Transport in Saharsa
Jan Sadharan Express trains